The Nauru national rugby union team is the national team of the third tier rugby union playing nation of Nauru. The team made its full international debut in the 2019 Oceania Cup. Rugby union in Nauru is administered by the Nauru Rugby Union.

Nauru has yet to qualify for the Rugby World Cup.

Results
Note the winning team is given first.

2019 Oceania Cup

 Papua New Guinea 89-5  Nauru
 Solomon Islands 61-7  Nauru
 Niue 89-5  Nauru

Current squad
2019 Oceania Cup
1. Sherlock Denuga - Prop
2. Ashly Scott Dagan Kaierua - Hooker
3. Jake Debao - Prop
4. Abraham Eroni Itsimaera - Lock
5. Dunstall Harris - Lock
6. Johnson Scotty - Flanker
7. Fulton Hogan Amram - Flanker
8. Damon Ivorab Adeang - Number 8
9. Zacharias Detenamo - Scrum-half
10. Kristidas Merike -Fly-half
11. Elkodawn Dagiaro - Wing
12. Lloyd Mark Dero Vunipola - Centre
13. Romanus Hartman - Centre
14. Junior Agiangang - Wing
15. Rasmussen Dowabobo - Fullback
16. Dean Kepae - Substitute
17. Felix Kepae - Substitute
18. Zechariah Temaki - Substitute
19. Kane Solomon - Substitute
20. Denuga Vito - Substitute
21. Lockett Mau - Substitute
22. Myer Temaki - Substitute
23. Otto Adam - Substitute

Sponsors

 Team Spirit (technical sponsor)
 Nauru Airlines
 Digicel
 Australian Aid

See also
 Rugby union in Nauru

References

External links
Nauru Rugby Union Facebook

 
Oceanian national rugby union teams